Josif Pashko (May 25, 1918 - September 5, 1963) was an Albanian politician during the country's socialist period.

Biography
Josif Pashko was born into a peasant family in the village of Vodica, Kolonja. In 1938 he graduated from the Normal School at Elbasan and served as an elementary school teacher in that town from 1939 to 1942. Together with his father Pashko Vodica he joined the communist-led resistance to Italian occupation in 1942, becoming a political commissar of various brigades.

After the war he was involved in the armed forces, security and judicial organs. From 1950 onwards he was a deputy in the People's Assembly. From 1954 until his death he was a government minister in charge of construction.

During the war he joined the Communist Party of Albania (Party of Labour of Albania after 1948) and became a member of its Central Committee in 1952.

His son Gramoz Pashko was an economist who co-founded the Democratic Party of Albania in 1990.

References
 Skendi, Stavro (ed). Albania. New York: Frederick A. Praeger. 1956. p. 338.

1918 births
1963 deaths
People from Kolonjë
Labour Party of Albania politicians
Government ministers of Albania
Construction ministers of Albania
20th-century Albanian politicians
Albanian communists
Albanian schoolteachers